The University of Music and Performing Arts Graz, also known as Kunstuniversität Graz (KUG) is an  Austrian university. Its roots can be traced back to the music school of the Akademischer Musikverein founded in 1816, making it the oldest university of music in Austria.

History 
In 1963 the Conservatoire of the Province of Styria was elevated to an Austrian state institution – the Academy of Music and Performing Arts in Graz. Its president (1963–1971) was Erich Marckhl. As a result of the 1970 Kunsthochschulorganisationsgesetz [Universities of the Arts Organisation Act] the academy became the Hochschule für Musik und darstellende Kunst in Graz. Friedrich Korcak was appointed as the first rector in 1971.

A concert series was set up as early as 1982, in collaboration with the Association of Friends of the Hochschule für Musik und darstellende Kunst Graz, which at the time include three different series: the main concert series, abo@MUMUTH and the concert series for young audiences.

In 1983, KUG (at that time still a Hochschule) was granted the authority to award degrees. The first doctoral degree programme was offered in 1986 and the first graduation ceremony was held on 21 June 1991.

KUG received its current name in 1998, when the Federal Act on Organisation of Universities of the Arts (KUOG 98) came into effect and all Austrian art academies were renamed "universities".

In September 2009, academic and artistic doctoral schools were established at the University of Music and Performing Arts Graz. With its Dr.artium programme, KUG became the first university in Austria (and according to the university itself, the first institution in the German-speaking countries), to offer an artistic  doctorate degree. This academic doctoral school replaced the previous inter-university philosophy and science doctoral degrees. The first artistic doctoral degree was completed at KUG in 2013.

In the winter semester 2019/2020 there were 1903 students taking degree courses at KUG (1512 primarily registered at KUG and 391 taking courses offered in partnership with another institution and primarily registered at the partner institution under "official co-registration"), plus 296 non-degree students. The proportion of women was 47%. The proportion of foreign students was 50% (for students taking degree courses and primarily registered at KUG), or just below 52% (taking into account "official co-registration" and non-degree students, particularly the programmes for promotion of emerging talent, and for children and young people).

Since 1989, KUG has held an International Chamber Music Competition "Franz Schubert and Modern Music" every three years.

Leadership 
 1963–1971: Erich Marckhl (founding president)
 1971–1979: Friedrich Korcak (first appointed rector)
 1979–1987: Otto Kolleritsch
 1987–1991: Sebastian Benda
 1991–2007: Otto Kolleritsch
 2007–2012: Georg Schulz
 2013–2014: Robert Höldrich (Executive Vice-Rector, interim)
 2014–2018: Elisabeth Freismuth
 2018–2020: Eike Straub
 Since 1 March 2020: Georg Schulz

It was announced that Georg Schulz would return as rector in October 2018. Due to an appeal by the Equal Opportunities Committee relating to alleged discrimination against Rector Freismuth (who was still in office) on the basis of gender, age and ideology, from 1 October 2018 an interim rectorship was instated under the leadership of Executive Vice-Rector Eike Straub. At the start of the summer semester 2020 Georg Schulz took up the rectorship again. His team consists of Vice-Rectors Gerd Grupe (Research, Gender and Diversity), Barbara Simandl (Finance and HR administration), Constanze Wimmer (Academic and international Affairs) and Marie-Theres Holler (Infrastructure and Digitalisation). Alongside his statutory duties as rector, Georg Schulz is also responsible for art and quality management.

Campus 
The Palais Meran has been the main building of the University of Music and Performing Arts Graz since 1963 and is used not only as a venue for events, but also by several institutes and administrative bodies. It was built between 1841 and 1843 in the late classical style by Georg Hauberisser senior on the grounds of a former Meierhof, (a building occupied by the estate administrator) and was the residence of Styrian Habsburg Archduke Johann.

The MUMUTH project took first prize in an international competition won by Dutch architect Ben van Berkel in 1998. It was opened in 2009 and is dominated by steel, concrete and glass in various combinations and superimpositions.  As well as the large  György-Ligeti-Saal, a concert space with an elaborate system of variable acoustics, it offers an orchestra rehearsal space and a rehearsal stage, plus additional studios, workshops and theatre infrastructure. In 2010 MUMUTH was awarded the Fischer von Erlach Prize and the Urban Land Institute Award for its architecture.

The Neubau [New Building] was constructed between 1988 and 1993 based on plans by Viennese architect, Klaus Musil. It is also known as the "Piano", because of its footprint. The first floor holds ensemble and seminar rooms, while the extended top floor boasts 83 rooms for individual tuition.  On the ground floor are the canteen and the Aula (auditorium). The neighbouring building, erected in 1998, houses the library and the archive.

The Theater im Palais (T.i.P.) is home to the Institute of Drama and its rehearsal spaces and stage areas. The building, which is separated from the palace itself by the courtyard, was originally used as a cart shed and stables.  In 2013/14 the building was renovated based on plans by architect Johannes Wohofsky, and extended with a new glass foyer giving a view of the old facade. The exterior shell in front of the facade, made from gold-coloured, perforated aluminium sheet creates a visual design feature and provides shade from the sun.

The Reiterkaserne, which is a listed building, was built in the 1840s to accommodate cavalrymen, and served as barracks for around 100 years.  It has been renovated since 2005 on the basis of plans by Graz-based architect Josef Hohensinn.  The building encloses a courtyard, and a new structure has been added facing onto Leonhardstrasse.  Since 2007 it has housed teaching rooms and office space (particularly for the Institute of Music Education), concert halls and the workshops of the Institute of Stage Design.

The former Palais Schwarzenberg, which originates from the 16th century, contains the Institute of Church Music and Organ, together with its Centre for Organ Research, on two floors.  The historic arcade courtyard is one of the outstanding architectural treasures of the old town of Graz. The institute's rooms include rehearsal spaces, a recording studio and offices, plus a total of nine pipe organs of different constructions, a digital electronic organ and other related instruments.

Other KUG facilities can be found at Brandhofgasse 18, Elisabethstrasse 11, Moserhofgasse 34 and 39–41, Heinrichstrasse 78, Inffeldgasse 10 and 12, Leonhardstrasse 18 and 21, Lichtenfelsgasse 21, Maiffredygasse 12b, Merangasse 38, Mozartgasse 3 and Petersgasse 116.[35] There is also a campus in Oberschützen (Burgenland).  There is also a campus in Oberschützen (Burgenland).

Artistic-Scientific Facilities 
 Institute 1 Composition, Theory of Music, History of Music and Conducting
 Institute 2 Piano
 Institute 3 Strings
 Institute 4 Wind and Percussion Instruments
 Institute 5 Music Education
 Institute 6 Church Music and Organ
 Institute 7 Voice, Lied and Oratorio
 Institute 8 Jazz
 Institute 9 Drama
 Institute 10 Opera
 Institute 11 Stage Design
 Institute 12 Oberschützen
 Institute 13 Ethnomusicology
 Institute 14 Aesthetics of Music
 Institute 15 Early Music and Performance Practice
 Institute 16 Jazz Research
 Institute 17 Electronic Music and Acoustics

 Doctoral School for Scholarly Doctoral Studies
 Artistic Doctoral School
 Centre for Gender Studies

Fields of Study 
 Stage design
 Communication, Media, Sound and Interaction Design – Sound Design (in partnership with the Fachhochschule Joanneum)
 Computer Music
 Performing Arts / Drama
 Conducting: Choral Conducting, Opera Repetiteur Work, Orchestral Conducting and Choral Conducting Education
 Artistic-Academic Doctoral Degree (doctor artium)
 Academic Doctoral Degree (PhD)
 Electrical Sound Engineer (in collaboration with Graz University of Technology)
 Vocal Studies: Voice, Concert Singing, Opera, Performance Practice in Contemporary Music (PPCM) – Vocal
 Music Education – Instrumental and Vocal: Classical, Jazz und Folk Music
 Instrumental Studies Classical, Early Music, Performance Practice in Contemporary Music (PPCM)
 Jazz
 Catholic and Protestant Church Music
 Composition and Music Theory: Composition, Opera Composition, Music Theory and Education in Composition and Music Theory
 Teacher Training: Music Education, Instrumental Teaching, Technical and Textile Design (in Lehramtsverbund Süd-Ost)
 Musicology (in collaboration with the University of Graz)

Almost all courses are offered under the Bologna system, with three or four year bachelor's degrees, two year master's degrees and three year doctoral degrees. Exceptions to this are Stage Design and Performing Arts, both of which are four-year diploma courses.

Honorary members 
(brackets: year of award)
 Joseph Marx (1882–1964), Austrian composer  (1963)
 Henri Gagnebin (1886–1977), Swiss composer  (1963)
 Johann Nepomuk David (1895–1977), Austrian composer  (1963)
 Karl Böhm (1894–1981), Austrian conductor  (1964)
 Frank Martin (1890–1974), Swiss composer  (1966)
 Zoltán Kodály (1882–1967), Hungarian composer  (1966)
 Egon Wellesz (1885–1974), British-Austrian composer  (1968)
 Darius Milhaud (1892–1974), French composer  (1968)
 Luigi Dallapiccola (1904–1975), Italian composer  (1969)
 Ernst Moravec, Austrian violinist  (1969)
 Ernst Krenek (1900–1991), Austrian-born American composer  (1969)
 Alfred Brendel (* 1931), Austrian pianist  (1981)
 Andrés Segovia (1893–1987), Spanish guitarist  (1985)
 Gundula Janowitz (* 1937), Austrian singer  (1986)
 Jenő Takács (1902–2005), pianist (1987)
 Christa Ludwig (1928–2021), German singer  (1988)
 György Ligeti (1923–2006), Hungarian composer  (1989)
 Nikolaus Harnoncourt (1929–2016), Austrian conductor and music researcher  (1995)
 Art Farmer (1928–1999), American jazz trumpeter  (1998)
 Hans Werner Henze (1926–2012), German composer  (1999)
 Josef "Joe" Zawinul (1932–2007), Austrian jazz musician  (2002)
 Otto Kolleritsch (* 1934), KUG Rector Emeritus  (2004)
 Sheila Jordan (* 1928), American jazz musician  (2015)

Honorary doctorate 
 Phil Collins (* 1951), British musician  (2019)

Professors 
 Julian Argüelles (* 1966), jazz saxophonist
 Erich Bachträgl (1944–2011), jazz drummer and composer
 Péter Barsony, violist
 Ulf Bästlein (* 1959), singer
 Franck Bedrossian (* 1971), composer
 Adrianus Bezuijen, singer
 Ida Bieler (* 1950), violinist
 Andreas Böhlen (* 1983), recorder player and saxophonist
 Luis Bonilla (* um 1965), jazz trombonist
 Joseph Breinl, pianist and vocal accompanist
 Petrit Çeku, guitarist
 Marko Ciciliani, composition and multimedia
 Milana Chernyavska, pianist
 Chia Chou, pianist
 Howard Curtis, jazz drummer
 Dena DeRose (* 1966), jazz singer
 André Doehring (* 1973), musicologist (jazz and popular music)
 Andreas Dorschel (* 1962), philosopher
 Julius Drake (* 1959), vocal accompanist
 Holger Falk (* ca. 1972), singer
 Beat Furrer (* 1954), composer
 Clemens Gadenstätter (* 1966), composer
 Michael Hell, harpsichordist and recorder player
 Robert Höldrich, composer and researcher (electrotechnology)
 Klaus Hubmann (* 1959), musicologist and bassoon player
 Erich Kleinschuster (1930–2018), jazz trombonist and composer
 Gerd Kühr (* 1952), composer
 Boris Kuschnir (* 1948), violinist
 Klaus Lang (* 1971), composer
 Thomas Lechner, percussionist (timpanist)
 Maighread McCrann, violinist
 Karlheinz Miklin (1946–2019), jazz saxophonist and composer
 Silvia Marcovici, violinist
 Clemens Nachtmann (* 1965), composer
 Elena Pankratova, singer
 Edward Partyka, jazz composer and arranger
Alexander Pavlovsky (*1977), first violinist of the Jerusalem Quartet
 Paolo Pegoraro, guitarist
 Marc Piollet (* 1962), conductor
 Olaf Polziehn (* 1970), jazz pianist
 Amy Power (* 1980), oboist
 Franz Karl Praßl (* 1954), theologian, church musician und composer
 Gerald Preinfalk (* 1971), saxophonist
 Johannes Prinz (* 1958), choral conductor
 Morten Ramsbøl (* 1970), jazz double bass player
 Janne Rättyä, accordionist
 Peter Revers (* 1954), musicologist
 Matthias Rieß, horn player
 Gunther Rost (* 1974), organist
 James Rotondi, jazz trumpeter
 Stefan Schilling, clarinettist
 Markus Schirmer (* 1963), pianist
 Susanne Scholz, violinist (historical violin instruments)
 Hans Peter Schuh, trumpeter
 Heiko Senst (* 1968), actor
 Wolfgang Strasser, trombonist
 Werner Strenger (* 1969), trombonist
 Olivier Tambosi (* 1963), opera director
 Tara Venditti, singer
 Martin Wagemann, trumpeter
 Wolfgang Wengenroth, conductor
 Constanze Wimmer, music communicator and cultural manager

Former students and graduates 
 Peter Simonischek (* 1946), Austrian actor
 Marjana Lipovšek (* 1946), Slovenian singer
 Wolfgang Böck (* 1953), Austrian actor
 August Schmölzer (* 1958), Austrian actor
 Fabio Luisi (* 1959), Italian conductor
 Martin Kušej (* 1961), Austrian director
 Petra Morzé (* 1964), Austrian actor
 Marion Mitterhammer (* 1965), Austrian actor
 Klaus T. Steindl (* 1966), Austrian director 
 Anna Böttcher (* 1967), German actor
 Natalia Ushakova (* 1969), Russian-Austrian opera singer
 Matthias Loibner (* 1969), Austrian composer and hurdy-gurdy player
 Ulrich Drechsler (* 1969), German jazz saxophonist
 Nataša Mirković (* 1972), Bosnian singer and actor
 Andreas Großbauer (* 1974), Austrian violinist
 Andreas Kiendl (* 1975), Austrian actor
 Nenad Vasilić (* 1975), Serbian-born Austrian jazz bass player and composer
 Andreas Reize (* 19 May 1975), organist and conductor, Thomaskantor
 Annette Dasch (* 1976), German opera singer
 Siegmar Brecher (* 1978), Austrian jazz saxophonist
 Andrea Wenzl (* 1979), Austrian actor
 Christoph Luser (* 1980), Austrian actor
 Christian Bakanic (* 1980), Austrian accordionist
 Christoph Pepe Auer (* 1981), Austrian jazz saxophonist
 Elisabeth Breuer (* 1984), Austrian singer
 Sascha Hois (* 1986), Austrian trombonist
 Mirga Gražinytė-Tyla (* 1986), Lithuanian conductor
 Benjamin Morrison (* 1986), New Zealand violinist
 Katharina Klar (* 1987), Austrian actor
 Alina Pinchas (* 1988), Uzbeck violinist
 Katia Ledoux (* 1990), French opera singer
 Diana Tishchenko (* 1990), Ukrainian violinist
 Fedor Rudin (* 1992), French-Russian violinist
 Patrick Hahn (* 1995), Austrian conductor

References

External links
 kug.ac.at

 
Educational institutions established in 1816
1816 establishments in the Austrian Empire
Arts organizations established in the 1810s
Education in Graz
Buildings and structures in Graz